The Australian Maritime College (AMC) is a tertiary education institution based in Launceston, Tasmania, established by the Maritime College Act 1978 (Cth). Tertiary education is provided and organised by the University of Tasmania (UTAS) as the Australian Maritime College at the University of Tasmania (AMC@UTAS). However the college's educational curriculum is governed by the independent AMC Board. The AMC is Australia's national centre for maritime education, training and research. It has two campuses located within  of each other in Northern Tasmania, each with different facilities and residence.

AMC comprises two national centres that offer courses in maritime engineering, marine environment, maritime logistics and seafaring. The national centres are:
The National Centre for Maritime Engineering and Hydrodynamics
The National Centre for Ports and Shipping

AMC also has a commercial arm, AMC Search Ltd, that provides maritime related training and consultancy for a wide range of international and Australian organisations and individuals including the Federal Government Pacific Patrol Boat Program.

Newnham Campus

The AMC's main campus is situated at Newnham, 6 kilometres from the centre of Tasmania's second largest city, Launceston. Facilities located at the Newnham campus include:
Centre for Maritime Simulation
Recently refurbished facility that boasts a full mission bridge, tug bridge and six smaller, fully integrated simulators capable of reproducing busy ports in a range of conditions. 
Towing Tank
Model Test Basin 
This  facility is ideally suited for conducting hydrodynamic experiments with an emphasis on maritime operations within shallow water environments. 
Aquaculture Centre 
One of the only dedicated facilities for the study of fish and shellfish cultivation in Australia and as such has extensive aquarium facilities used for both research and teaching.
Cavitation Research Laboratory
This facility is dedicated to the study of cavitation – vapour cavities formed by low pressure – on foils, propellers and other underwater forms. It also features rigorous control of dissolved and free small bubble gas content.
Survival Centre
The centre is used for the conduct of training exercises, to test new life saving appliances and for some research activities. It consists of an indoor heated pool and a mock ship's superstructure, complete with life raft launching facilities.

The AMC is unique as it is the only University in the world to have all these facilities in one area.

AMC also has a Marine Firetraining Centre located at Bell Bay, 48 km north of Launceston, which is equipped with a full range of marine firefighting equipment and specialises in practical training.

Master Planning 
The campus is currently undergoing a Master Planning exercise as the University of Tasmania will be moving to the Inveresk precinct located closer to CBD of Launceston

Beauty Point Facilities

The Beauty Point facilities are home to AMC's training vessels, including Bluefin, Reviresco, and Stephen Brown.

Sydney Facilities
Located at the Australian National Maritime Museum, AMC conducts postgraduate programs at the Sydney facility.

Accommodation

Investigator Hall

Investigator Hall is AMC's residence on the Newnham Campus and provides catered accommodation to both AMC and University of Tasmania students.  The residence is named after , the vessel used by Matthew Flinders to circumnavigate Australia.

Programs
The AMC offers both undergraduate and postgraduate programs in fields such as Maritime Engineering & Hydrodynamics, Maritime Business & International Logistics and Ocean Seafaring. In addition the AMC also offers Coastal Seafaring VET course. The AMC also manages and teaches maritime and logistics management major courses in the Bachelor of Business and Master of Business Administration programs together with the Tasmanian School of Business and Economics, UTAS.

Radio Operator licensing
AMC runs courses in maritime radio procedures and also testing for maritime radio operator licenses.

In March 2019, AMC was awarded by the Australian Communications and Media Authority (ACMA) a Deed of Agreement to provide Amateur Radio license testing for Australia, and administration of license issue recommendations to ACMA. AMC has used an already established system of exam invigilators, often associated with Amateur Radio Clubs, who receive license tests from AMC upon application by candidates, conduct the test session, and return the tests to AMC for marking and further administration. While ACMA formally issues licenses, it does so upon advice from ACM that also administers beacon and repeater licenses, and changes of licenses.

Notable alumni
 CEO of Abu Dhabi Ports Capt. Mohamed Juma Al Shamisi
 Head of Maritime Union of Australia Mich-Elle Myers

See also

 List of universities in Australia

References

External links

Australian Maritime College Website

 
Australian tertiary institutions
Education in Tasmania
Schools and Faculties of the University of Tasmania
Commonwealth Government agencies of Australia
Maritime colleges in Australia
Launceston, Tasmania